Sehonghong is a community council located in the Thaba-Tseka District of Lesotho. In 2006 its population was 5,814. The village of Sehonghong is located between Taung and Matebeng on the Senqu River.

Villages
The community of Sehonghong includes the villages of Aupolasi, Ha 'Molaoa, Ha Fusi, Ha Mahlatsi, Ha Makhabane, Ha Mpiko, Ha Poko, Ha Sekhaupane, Ha Setene, Ha Setontolo, Ha Tebalo, Ha Tomose, Libete Kheseng, Lebung, Liqaleng, Manganeng, Mangaung, Maputsoaneng, Masakoane, Matsikeng, `Matsòoana, Mats`olong, Moreneng, Phororong, Pote, Clarke, Sekhutloaneng, Sekoainyane, Sekokoaneng and Tlokoeng.

References

External links
 Google map of community villages

Populated places in Thaba-Tseka District
Thaba-Tseka District